King Changó is a Latin ska band from New York City, New York with roots in Venezuela. Its name comes from Changó, the Afro-Cuban god of war.

José Andrés Blanco, "Blanquito Man", died on November 16, 2017, due to complications from colon cancer.

Members 
 José Andrés Blanco, Blanquito Man – vocals and percussion
 Ruben Verde – guitars
 Luis Eduardo Blanco, Negrito Man – keyboard, cuatro and percussion
 Luis Jesús Ruiz, El Pulpo – drums and percussion
 Miguel Oldenburg – guitar
 Fernando Vélez – percussion
 Martin Adrian Cunningham, Martín Perna – tenor saxophone
 Mike Wagner – trombone and guitar
 Andy Shaw – bass
 Glenda Lee – bass
 Jason Anderson, Willie Dinamita
 Vincent Veloso saxophone, trumpet, trombone, flute
 Ramón Nova
 Rodney Shelby Siau – trumpet
 Efrain Jurado Olivares, Cachorro – keyboard
 Jason Seymour – trombone
 Candice Cannabis Blonde Phantom – vocals
Ray Lugo – vocals

Discography

Albums
 King Changó (1996)
 The Return of El Santo (2000)

Compilations
 Silencio=Muerte: Red Hot + Latin – Track 10, "Quien Quiera Que Seas" (English: "Whoever You Are") with Geggy Tah (1997)
 "Outlandos D'Americas: A Rock En Espanol Tribute To The Police" – Track 13, "Venezuelan in New York" a cover from Englishman in New York by Sting (2000)
 Mo Vida Putamaya Presents Various Artists Track 6, "Melting Pot" (2000)

References

External links
 
 King Changó at Gale Group
King Changó at Instagram

Musical groups established in 1996
Musical groups from New York City
Third-wave ska groups
American ska musical groups
Luaka Bop artists